The  Abilene Ruff Riders season was the team's fourth season as a professional indoor football franchise and second in the Indoor Football League (IFL). One of twenty-five teams competing in the IFL for the 2010 season, the Abilene, Texas-based Abilene Ruff Riders were members of the Lonestar West Division of the Intense Conference.

Under the leadership of head coach Gerald Dockery, the team played their home games at the Taylor County Expo Center in Abilene, Texas.

Schedule

Regular season

Standings

Roster

References

External links
Abilene Ruff Riders official statistics

Abilene Ruff Riders
Abilene Ruff Riders